My Husband Got a Family (also known as Unexpected You) is a 2012 South Korean television series starring Kim Nam-joo, Yoo Jun-sang, and Youn Yuh-jung. It aired on KBS2 from February 25 to September 9, 2012 on Saturdays and Sundays at 19:55 for 58 episodes.

The weekend family drama centers on a working woman named Cha Yoon-hee (played by Kim Nam-joo) as her husband, who was put up for international adoption, reunites with his biological parents. Yoon-hee faces the unexpected burden of having to build a relationship with her new-found in-laws.

During its more than five-month run, it topped the weekly ratings chart for 25 consecutive weeks and reached a ratings peak of 45.8 percent (TNmS) and 52.3 percent (AGB Nielsen). The series ranked number one overall on the 2012 yearly TV ratings chart.

Plot
Cha Yoon-hee (Kim Nam-joo) is a successful TV drama producer/director who marries an orphaned doctor (Yoo Jun-sang) and thereby acquires the supposed, ultimate career woman's dream―accomplished husband minus the in-laws. Her marital bliss is shattered when her husband finds his birth parents and they happen to be her next-door neighbors with whom she bickers on a daily basis, and feature not one, but three sisters-in-law, and the usual array of aunts and grandmothers-in-law. Yoon-hee realizes she has married more than she has bargained for. Once again, the stage is set for a butting of the heads between daughter and mother-in-law (Youn Yuh-jung).

Cast
Kim Nam-joo as Cha Yoon-hee 
Terry Kang wife; Se-joong's younger sister and Se-kwang older sister
Yoo Jun-sang as Terry Kang / Bang Gwi-nam
Yoon-hee's husband; Il-sook's younger brother and older brother of Yi-sook and Mal-sook

Cha Yoon-hee's family 

Kim Young-ran as Han Man-hee
Se-joong, Yoon-hee, and Se-kwang's mother; Ji-young and Terry Kang's mother-in-law
Kim Yong-hee as Cha Se-joong
Yoon-hee and Se-kwang's older brother
Jin Kyung as Min Ji-young
Se-joong's wife
Kang Min-hyuk as Cha Se-kwang
Se-joong and Yoon-hee's younger brother

Bang Chang-soo's house 

Kang Boo-ja as Jeon Mak-rye
Il-sook, Gwi-nam, Yi-sook, and Mal-sook's grandmother; Jang-soo, Jung-hoon, and Jung-bae's mother; Chung-ae, Yang-shil, and Go Ok's mother-in-law
Jang Yong as Bang Jang-soo
Chung-ae's husband; Il-sook, Gwi-nam, Yi-sook, and Mal-sook's father
Youn Yuh-jung as Uhm Chung-ae
Jang-soo's wife; Il-sook, Gwi-nam, Yi-sook, and Mal-sook's mother
Yang Jung-a as Bang Il-sook
Gwi-nam, Yi-sook, and Mal-sook's older sister; Nam Nam-goo's ex-wife; Nam Min-ji's mother
Jo Yoon-hee as Bang Yi-sook
Il-sook and Gwi-nam younger sister; Mal-sook's older sister
Oh Yeon-seo as Bang Mal-sook
Il-sook, Gwi-nam, and Yi-sook younger sister
Jeon Hwi-heon as Nam Min-ji
Il-sook and Nam-goo's daughter; Gwi-nam, Yi-sook, and Mal-sook's niece

Bang Jung-hoon's family 

 Song Geum-shik as Bang Jung-hoon
Yang-shil's husband; Il-sook, Gwi-nam, Yi-sook, and Mal-sook's younger uncle
Na Young-hee as Jang Yang-shil
Jung-hoon's wife; Il-sook, Gwi-nam, Yi-sook, and Mal-sook's uncle's wife

Bang Jung-bae's family 

Kim Sang-ho as Bang Jung-bae  
Go-ok's husband; Il-sook, Gwi-nam, Yi-sook, and Mal-sook's youngest uncle; Jang-goon's father
Shim Yi-young as Go-ok
Jung-bae's wife; Il-sook, Gwi-nam, Yi-sook, and Mal-sook's uncle's wife; Jang-goon's mother
Kwak Dong-yeon as Bang Jang-goon
Jung-bae and Go-ok's son; Il-sook, Gwi-nam, Yi-sook, and Mal-sook's cousin

Chung-ae's sister 

Yu Ji-in as Uhm Bo-ae
Chung-ae's younger sister; Soon-ae's older sister; Il-sook, Gwi-nam, Yi-sook, and Mal-sook aunt
Yang Hee-kyung as Uhm Soon-ae
Chung-ae and Bo-ae's younger sister; Il-sook, Gwi-nam, Yi-sook, and Mal-sook aunt

Extended 

Lee Hee-joon as Chun Jae-yong
Yoon-hee's old student; Restaurant president
Kim Won-jun as Yoon Bin
Former idol
Park Soo-jin as Song Soo-jin
A doctor at Gwi Nam's hospital and childhood friend from the US
Kim Hyung-bum as Nam Nam-goo
Il-sook's ex-husband; Min-ji's father
Kang Dong-ho as Han Kyu-hyun
Yi-sook's first love
 Lim Geu-rin as Unknown
Bakery's employee
Kim Hyung-jin as Tae-young
Restaurant Staff
 Geun Ho-seok as Yoo Beom
Se-kwang's friend
Lee Ga-ryeong as Yoo Shin-hye's colleague

Cameo appearances 

 Park Min-jung as Seo Yoo-rim
Actress acting in the drama Yoon-hee is producing
 Go Do-young as Yoon-hee's workplace junior
 Go Seo-hee as Writer writing the drama Yoon-hee is producing
 Jung Chang-sung as Chief secretary
 Lee Chae-min as Customer
Lee Jae-yong as Jae-yong's father
Kil Yong-woo as Gwi-nam's adoptive father
Kim Chang-sook as Gwi-nam's adoptive mother
Kwak Min-suk as PD Ji
Lee Do-hyun as Ji-hwan
Hwang Dong-joo as Fake Gwi-nam
Yoo In-young as Yoo Shin-hye
Choi Yoon-so as Kang Hye-soo
Kim Seung-woo as man studying for the bar exams (ep 5–6)
Kim Jang-hoon as Yoon Bin's sunbae (ep 16)
Hong Eun-hee as a difficult actress (ep 18)
Ji Jin-hee as pastor (ep 19)
Lee Soo-geun as Yoon Bin's ex-manager (ep 21)
Cha Tae-hyun as Cha Tae-bong, Yoon-hee's ex-boyfriend (ep 26)
Sung Si-kyung as has-been singer Sung Si-kaeng (ep 32)
ZE:A as themselves (ep 39)
Song Joon-geun as top drama actor (ep 40)
Lee Hye-young as top drama actress (ep 40)
Lee Jung-shin as Mal-sook's blind date (ep 42)
Kim Jong-min as audition judge (ep 46)
Shin Se-kyung as Shin Se-kyung (ep 49)
Kim Joon-hyun as variety show PD
Lee Jong-hak as singing instructor
Yang Hee-eun as radio DJ
Kim Kyung-jin as Teuk Byeol-chul
Tak Jae-hoon as marketer
Jung Kyung-mi as Yoon Bin's mom fan
Kim Seo-hyung as Jae-yong's first sister
Jo Ha-rang as Jae-yong's second sister
Lee Je-in as Jae-yong's youngest sister
Gong Hyung-jin as man arguing with Yoon-hee
Park So-hyun as radio DJ

Ratings
 In the table below,  represent the lowest ratings and  represent the highest ratings.

Awards and nominations

International broadcast
It aired in Japan on cable channel KNTV from February 13 to June 26, 2013 under the title .

It aired in the Philippines via GMA Network on April 8, 2013 under the title Unexpected You.

It aired in Singapore on Channel U

It aired in Thailand on Workpoint TV on July 1, 2015 under the title s̄ap̣hı̂ cxm s̄æb สะใภ้จอมแสบ (Troublemaker Daughter-in-Law).

A Mexican channel recreated the drama with the title, Mi marido tiene familia

References

External links
  
 
 
 

2012 South Korean television series debuts
2012 South Korean television series endings
Korean Broadcasting System television dramas
Korean-language television shows
South Korean comedy television series
South Korean romance television series
Television shows written by Park Ji-eun
Television series by Logos Film